Ranunculus fallax is a species of flowering plant belonging to the family Ranunculaceae.

Its native range is Sweden to Ukraine.

References

fallax